The Migration Period, also known as the Barbarian Invasions, was a period in European history marked by large-scale migrations that saw the fall of the Western Roman Empire and subsequent settlement of its former territories by various tribes, and the establishment of the post-Roman kingdoms. The term refers to the important role played by the migration, invasion, and settlement of various tribes, notably the Franks, Goths, Alemanni, Alans, Huns, early Slavs, Pannonian Avars, Magyars, and Bulgars within or into the former Western Empire and Eastern Europe. The period is traditionally taken to have begun in AD 375 (possibly as early as 300) and ended in 568. Various factors contributed to this phenomenon of migration and invasion, and their role and significance are still widely discussed.

Historians differ as to the dates for the beginning and ending of the Migration Period. The beginning of the period is widely regarded as the invasion of Europe by the Huns from Asia in about 375 and the ending with the conquest of Italy by the Lombards in 568, but a more loosely set period is from as early as 300 to as late as 800. For example, in the 4th century a very large group of Goths was settled as foederati within the Roman Balkans, and the Franks were settled south of the Rhine in Roman Gaul. In 406 a particularly large and unexpected crossing of the Rhine was made by a group of Vandals, Alans and Suebi. As central power broke down in the Western Roman Empire, the military became more important but was dominated by men of barbarian origin.

There are contradictory opinions as to whether the fall of the Western Roman Empire was a result of an increase in migrations, or both the breakdown of central power and the increased importance of non-Romans resulted in internal Roman factors. Migrations, and the use of non-Romans in the military, were known in the periods before and after, and the Eastern Roman Empire adapted and continued to exist until the fall of Constantinople to the Ottomans in 1453. The fall of the Western Roman Empire, although it involved the establishment of competing barbarian kingdoms, was to some extent managed by the eastern emperors.

The migrants comprised war bands or tribes of 10,000 to 20,000 people, but in the course of 100 years they numbered not more than 750,000 in total, compared to an average 40 million population of the Roman Empire at that time. Although immigration was common throughout the time of the Roman Empire, the period in question was, in the 19th century, often defined as running from about the 5th to 8th centuries. The first migrations of peoples were made by Germanic tribes such as the Goths (including the Visigoths and the Ostrogoths), the Vandals, the Anglo-Saxons, the Lombards, the Suebi, the Frisii, the Jutes, the Burgundians, the Alemanni, the Sciri and the Franks; they were later pushed westward by the Huns, the Avars, the Slavs and the Bulgars. Later invasions, such as the Vikings, the Normans, the Varangians, the Hungarians, the Moors, the Romani, the Turkics, and the Mongols also had significant effects (especially in North Africa, the Iberian Peninsula, Anatolia and Central and Eastern Europe).

Chronology

Germanic tribes prior to migration 

Germanic peoples moved out of southern Scandinavia and northern Germany to the adjacent lands between the Elbe and Oder after 1000 BC. The first wave moved westward and southward (pushing the resident Celts west to the Rhine around 200 BC), moving into southern Germany up to the Roman provinces of Gaul and Cisalpine Gaul by 100 BC, where they were stopped by Gaius Marius and later by Julius Caesar. It is this western group which was described by the Roman historian Tacitus (AD 56–117) and Julius Caesar (100–44 BC). A later wave of Germanic tribes migrated eastward and southward from Scandinavia, between 600 and 300 BC, to the opposite coast of the Baltic Sea, moving up the Vistula near the Carpathian Mountains. During Tacitus' era they included lesser-known tribes such as the Tencteri, Cherusci, Hermunduri and Chatti; however, a period of federation and intermarriage resulted in the familiar groups known as the Alemanni, Franks, Saxons, Frisians and Thuringians.

First wave 

The first wave of invasions, between AD 300 and 500, is partly documented by Greek and Latin historians but is difficult to verify archaeologically. It puts Germanic peoples in control of most areas of what was then the Western Roman Empire.

The Tervingi crossed the Danube into Roman territory after a clash with the Huns in 376. Some time later in Marcianopolis, the escort to their leader Fritigern was killed while meeting with Lupicinus. The Tervingi rebelled, and the Visigoths, a group derived either from the Tervingi or from a fusion of mainly Gothic groups, eventually invaded Italy and sacked Rome in 410 before settling in Gaul. Around 460, they founded the Visigothic Kingdom in Iberia. They were followed into Roman territory first by a confederation of Herulian, Rugian, and Scirian warriors under Odoacer, that deposed Romulus Augustulus in 476, and later by the Ostrogoths, led by Theodoric the Great, who settled in Italy. 

In Gaul, the Franks (a fusion of western Germanic tribes whose leaders had been aligned with Rome since the 3rd century) entered Roman lands gradually during the 5th century, and after consolidating power under Childeric and his son Clovis's decisive victory over Syagrius in 486, established themselves as rulers of northern Roman Gaul. Fending off challenges from the Alemanni, Burgundians, and Visigoths, the Frankish kingdom became the nucleus of what would later become France and Germany. 

The initial Anglo-Saxon settlement of Britain occurred during the 5th century, when Roman control of Britain had come to an end. The Burgundians settled in northwestern Italy, Switzerland and Eastern France in the 5th century.

Second wave 

 

Between AD 500 and 700, Slavic tribes settled more areas of central Europe and pushed farther into southern and eastern Europe, gradually making the eastern half of Europe predominantly Slavic. Additionally, Turkic tribes such as the Avars and later Ugric Magyars became involved in this second wave. In AD 567, the Avars and the Lombards destroyed much of the Gepid Kingdom. The Lombards, a Germanic people, settled in Italy with their Herulian, Suebian, Gepid, Thuringian, Bulgar, Sarmatian and Saxon allies in the 6th century. They were later followed by the Bavarians and the Franks, who conquered and ruled most of Italy.

The Bulgars, originally a nomadic group probably from Central Asia, occupied the Pontic steppe north of Caucasus since the 2nd century, but later, pushed by the Khazars, the majority of them migrated west and dominated Byzantine territories along the lower Danube in the 7th century. From that time the demographic picture of the Balkans changed permanently, becoming predominantly Slavic, while pockets of native people survived in the mountains of the Balkans.

During the early Byzantine–Arab Wars, Arab armies attempted to invade southeast Europe via Asia Minor during the late 7th and early 8th centuries but were defeated at the siege of Constantinople (717–718) by the joint forces of Byzantium and the Bulgars. During the Khazar–Arab Wars, the Khazars stopped the Arab expansion into Europe across the Caucasus (7th and 8th centuries). At the same time, the Moors (consisting of Arabs and Berbers) invaded Europe via Gibraltar (conquering Hispania from the Visigothic Kingdom in 711), before being halted by the Franks at the Battle of Tours in Gaul. These battles broadly demarcated the frontiers between Christendom and Islam for the next millennium. The following centuries saw the Muslims successful in conquering most of Sicily from the Christians by 902.

The Hungarian conquest of the Carpathian Basin from around AD 895 and the following Hungarian invasions of Europe and the Viking expansion from the late 8th century conventionally mark the last large movements of the period. Christian missionaries gradually converted the non-Islamic newcomers and integrated them into the Christendom.

Discussions

Barbarian identity 

Analysis of barbarian identity and how it was created and expressed during the Barbarian Invasions has elicited discussion among scholars. Wolfram observed that the significance of gens as a biological community was shifting, even during the early Middle Ages and that "to complicate matters, we have no way of devising a terminology that is not derived from the concept of nationhood created during the French Revolution".

The "primordialistic" paradigm prevailed during the 19th century. Scholars, such as German linguist Johann Gottfried Herder, viewed tribes as coherent biological (racial) entities, using the term to refer to discrete ethnic groups. He also believed that the Volk were an organic whole, with a core identity and spirit evident in art, literature and language. These characteristics were seen as intrinsic, unaffected by external influences, even conquest. Language, in particular, was seen as the most important expression of ethnicity. They argued that groups sharing the same (or similar) language possessed a common identity and ancestry. This was the Romantic ideal that there once had been a single German, Celtic or Slavic people who originated from a common homeland and spoke a common tongue, helping to provide a conceptual framework for political movements of the 18th and 19th centuries such as Pan-Germanism and Pan-Slavism.

From the 1960s, a reinterpretation of archaeological and historical evidence prompted scholars, such as Goffart and Todd, to propose new models for explaining the construction of barbarian identity. They maintained that no sense of shared identity was perceived by the Germani; a similar theory having been proposed for Celtic and Slavic groups.

A theory states that the primordialist mode of thinking was encouraged by a prima facie interpretation of Graeco-Roman sources, which grouped together many tribes under such labels as Germanoi, Keltoi or Sclavenoi, thus encouraging their perception as distinct peoples. Modernists argue that the uniqueness perceived by specific groups was based on common political and economic interests rather than biological or racial distinctions. Indeed, on this basis, some schools of thought in recent scholarship urge that the concept of Germanic peoples be jettisoned altogether.

The role of language in constructing and maintaining group identity can be ephemeral since large-scale language shifts occur commonly in history. Modernists propose the idea of "imagined communities"; the barbarian polities in late antiquity were social constructs rather than unchanging lines of blood kinship. The process of forming tribal units was called "ethnogenesis", a term coined by Soviet scholar Yulian Bromley. The Austrian school (led by Reinhard Wenskus) popularized this idea, which influenced medievalists such as Herwig Wolfram, Walter Pohl and Patrick J. Geary. This core group formed a standard for larger units, gathering adherents by employing amalgamative metaphors such as kinship and aboriginal commonality and claiming that they perpetuated an ancient, divinely-sanctioned lineage.

The common, track-filled map of the  may illustrate such [a] course of events, but it misleads. Unfolded over long periods of time, the changes of position that took place were necessarily irregular ... (with) periods of emphatic discontinuity. For decades and possibly centuries, the tradition bearers idled, and the tradition itself hibernated. There was ample time for forgetfulness to do its work.

Viewpoints 

Rather than "invasion", German and Slavic scholars speak of "migration" (and ), aspiring to the idea of a dynamic and "wandering Indo-Germanic people".

Historians have postulated several explanations for the appearance of "barbarians" on the Roman frontier: climate change, weather and crops, population pressure, a "primeval urge" to push into the Mediterranean, the construction of the Great Wall of China causing a "domino effect" of tribes being forced westward, leading to the Huns falling upon the Goths who, in turn, pushed other Germanic tribes before them. In general, French and Italian scholars have tended to view this as a catastrophic event, the destruction of a civilization and the beginning of a "Dark Age" that set Europe back a millennium. In contrast, German and English historians have tended to see Roman–Barbarian interaction as the replacement of a "tired, effete and decadent Mediterranean civilization" with a "more virile, martial, Nordic one".

The scholar Guy Halsall has seen the barbarian movement as the result of the fall of the Roman Empire, not its cause. Archaeological discoveries have confirmed that Germanic and Slavic tribes were settled agriculturalists who were probably merely "drawn into the politics of an empire already falling apart for quite a few other causes". Goffart argues that the process of settlement was connected to hospitalitas, the Roman practice of quartering soldiers among the civilian population. The Romans, by granting land and the right to levy taxes to allied (Germanic) armies, hoped to reduce the financial burdens of the empire. The Crisis of the Third Century caused significant changes within the Roman Empire in both its western and its eastern portions. In particular, economic fragmentation removed many of the political, cultural and economic forces that had held the empire together.

The rural population in Roman provinces became distanced from the metropolis, and there was little to differentiate them from other peasants across the Roman frontier. In addition, Rome increasingly used foreign mercenaries to defend itself. That "barbarisation" parallelled changes within Barbaricum. To this end, noted linguist Dennis Howard Green wrote, "the first centuries of our era witness not merely a progressive Romanisation of barbarian society, but also an undeniable barbarisation of the Roman world." 

For example, the Roman Empire played a vital role in building up barbarian groups along its frontier. Propped up with imperial support and gifts, the armies of allied barbarian chieftains served as buffers against other, hostile, barbarian groups. The disintegration of Roman economic power weakened groups that had come to depend on Roman gifts for the maintenance of their own power. The arrival of the Huns helped prompt many groups to invade the provinces for economic reasons.

The nature of the barbarian takeover of former Roman provinces varied from region to region. For example, in Aquitaine, the provincial administration was largely self-reliant. Halsall has argued that local rulers simply "handed over" military rule to the Ostrogoths, acquiring the identity of the newcomers. In Gaul, the collapse of imperial rule resulted in anarchy: the Franks and Alemanni were pulled into the ensuing "power vacuum", resulting in conflict. In Spain, local aristocrats maintained independent rule for some time, raising their own armies against the Vandals. Meanwhile, the Roman withdrawal from lowland England resulted in conflict between Saxons and the Brittonic chieftains (whose centres of power retreated westward as a result). The Eastern Roman Empire attempted to maintain control of the Balkan provinces despite a thinly-spread imperial army relying mainly on local militias and an extensive effort to refortify the Danubian limes. The ambitious fortification efforts collapsed, worsening the impoverished conditions of the local populace and resulting in colonization by Slavic warriors and their families.

Halsall and Noble have argued that such changes stemmed from the breakdown in Roman political control, which exposed the weakness of local Roman rule. Instead of large-scale migrations, there were military takeovers by small groups of warriors and their families, who usually numbered only in the tens of thousands. The process involved active, conscious decision-making by Roman provincial populations.

The collapse of centralized control severely weakened the sense of Roman identity in the provinces, which may explain why the provinces then underwent dramatic cultural changes even though few barbarians settled in them. Ultimately, the Germanic groups in the Western Roman Empire were accommodated without "dispossessing or overturning indigenous society", and they maintained a structured and hierarchical (but attenuated) form of Roman administration.

Ironically, they lost their unique identity as a result of such an  accommodation and were absorbed into Latinhood. In contrast, in the east, Slavic tribes maintained a more "spartan and egalitarian" existence bound to the land "even in times when they took their part in plundering Roman provinces". Their organizational models were not Roman, and their leaders were not normally dependent on Roman gold for success. Thus they arguably had a greater effect on their region than the Goths, the Franks or the Saxons had on theirs.

Ethnicity 
As a consequence, the shifting extensions of material cultures were interpreted as the expansion of peoples.

Influenced by constructionism, process-driven archaeologists rejected the culture-historical doctrine and marginalized the discussion of ethnicity altogether and focused on the intragroup dynamics that generated such material remains. Moreover, they argued that adoption of new cultures could occur through trade or internal political developments rather than only military takeovers.

Depiction in media 
 Terry Jones' Barbarians, a 4-part TV documentary series first broadcast on BBC 2 in 2006
 Rome: Total War: Barbarian Invasion and Total War: Attila, strategy games by The Creative Assembly
 Barbarians (miniseries), a documentary miniseries on The History Channel

See also 
 Bond event
 Dark Ages (historiography)
 Environmental migrant
 Genetic history of the British Isles
 Late Antiquity
 Medieval demography
 Migration Period art
 Five Barbarians and Sixteen Kingdoms
 Hephthalite Empire
 Immigration
 Turkic migration
 Middle Ages

References

Bibliography 

 
 
 Börm, Henning (2013), Westrom. Von Honorius bis Justinian, Kohlhammer Verlag, 
 
 
 
 Friedrich, Matthias and Harland, James M., eds. (2020): Interrogating the "Germanic": A Category and its Use in Late Antiquity and the Early Middle Ages. De Gruyter. .
 
 
 
 
 
 
 
 
 Kleineberg, A.; Marx, Chr.; Knobloch, E.; Lelgemann, D.: Germania und die Insel Thule. Die Entschlüsselung von Ptolemaios' "Atlas der Oikumene". WBG 2010. .

External links 
 

 
Historiography
Germanic history
Indo-European history
Germanic archaeology
1st millennium in Europe
1st millennium in Asia
1st millennium in Africa
Historical eras
Dark ages